The 1584 siege of Kaganoi was one of the final battles fought by Toyotomi Hideyoshi in his bid to gain the lands and power of Oda Nobunaga, who died two years earlier. 

Oda Nobukatsu was the most prominent of Nobunaga's relatives to oppose Hideyoshi in this quest.  Hideyoshi bombarded Oda Nobukatsu's fortress at Kaganoi, and captured it soon afterwards.

References

Kaganoi 1584
1584 in Japan
Conflicts in 1584
Kaganoi 1584